The 1976 Pacific Tigers football team represented the University of the Pacific (UOP) in the 1976 NCAA Division I football season as a member of the Pacific Coast Athletic Association.

The team was led by head coach Chester Caddas, in his fifth year, and played their home games at Pacific Memorial Stadium in Stockton, California. They finished the season with a record of two wins and nine losses (2–9, 0–4 PCAA). The Tigers were outscored 190–301 over the season, including six straight losses to end the season.

Schedule

Team players in the NFL
The following UOP players were selected in the 1977 NFL Draft.

Notes

References

Pacific
Pacific Tigers football seasons
Pacific Tigers football